Gozdno  is a village in the administrative district of Gmina Lubsko, within Żary County, Lubusz Voivodeship, in western Poland.

The village has a population of 59.

References

Gozdno